Hylobiini is a weevil tribe in the subfamily Molytinae.

Genera 
Subtribus: Epistrophina
 Cyriaspis – Epistrophus – Ischiomastus – Lymanchonus – Myrtacebius – Polymicrus – Pseudanchonus – Rhecas – Typacrus

Subtribus: Hylobiina
 Aclees – Arniticus – Byzes – Calvertius – Centor – Coffearhynchus – Dysprosoestus – Eudociminus – Gonzalezanthus – Haplogenus – Heilipodus – Heilipus – Heilus – Hesychobius – Hilipinus – Hylobiites – Hylobius – Imbilius – Iphipus – Kaiella – Kobuzo – Marshallius – Neseilipus – Nothofagius – Ozoctenus – Pachylobius – Pagiophloeus – Parabyzes – Paramecops – Perihylobius – Philophloeus – Pimelocerus – Placeilipus – Plethes – Porohylobius – Pseudaclees – Pseudopagiophloeus – Rhineilipus – Sandrarhyncolus – Scolinus – Sophronobius – Syphorbus – Tartarisus

Subtribus: Incertae Sedis
 Achelocis – Bantiades – Demyrsus – Gyrbykana – Howeotranes – Melanotranes – Memes – Miltotranes – Myrmecolixus – Opsittis – Paratranes – Tranes

References 

Molytinae
Polyphaga tribes